Ernest Robson Caygill (13 December 1886 – 21 March 1971) was a New Zealand cricketer. He played in eleven first-class matches for Canterbury from 1910 to 1914.

In 1953, Caygill was awarded the Queen Elizabeth II Coronation Medal.

See also
 List of Canterbury representative cricketers

References

External links
 

1886 births
1971 deaths
New Zealand cricketers
Canterbury cricketers
Cricketers from Christchurch